The Republican Union was a Spanish republican party founded in 1934 by Diego Martinez Barrio.

It was formed as a result of a merger of several small republican parties, including notably Diego Martinez Barrio's Radical Democratic Party founded in May 1934 by a split from Alejandro Lerroux's Radical Party in protest at the latter's alliance with the right-wing CEDA.

Integrated in the Popular Front ahead of the 1936 election, the party won 38 seats becoming the fourth largest party. It formed a governing coalition with Manuel Azaña's Republican Left. Though it participated in all republican governments during the Spanish Civil War, it played a minor role starting under Largo Caballero's government.
 
In exile in Mexico, it was the main support of the Republican government-in-exile until it was dissolved in 1959 to found the Spanish Democratic Republican Action along with the Republican Left.

See also
 Republican Union (Spain, 1893)
 Republican Union Party (Spain)

Bibliography
Nigel Townson. The Crisis of Democracy in Spain: Centrist Politics Under the Second Republic, 1931-1936. Sussex Academic Press. 2000. pp. 2–3.
Beevor, Antony. The Battle for Spain. The Spanish Civil War 1936-1939. Penguin Books. 2006. p. 456.

1934 establishments in Spain
1959 disestablishments in Spain
Defunct liberal political parties
Defunct political parties in Spain
Liberal parties in Spain
Political parties disestablished in 1959
Political parties established in 1934
Political parties of the Spanish Civil War
Progressive parties
Radical parties
Republican parties in Spain
Social liberal parties